The Marcos TSO is a sports car manufactured between 2004 and 2007 by Marcos. It features a Chevrolet V8 engine in either  or  versions. The car's components were CAD designed in England, while chassis engineering has been done by Prodrive. 

Also in 2004, the 5.7-litre Chevrolet Corvette (LS1) V8 TSO GT was announced, but solely for the Australian market. It was joined in 2005 by the GT2 for the European market.

In 2006 Marcos announced the TSO GTC, a modified version of the current TSO with a racing suspension, racing brakes and a rear diffuser. The car continues on with its Chevrolet-sourced  V8, but there is also a  Performance Pack available as well. With the bigger brakes, 340 mm AP Racing brakes, the TSO GTC delivers a 0-100-0 time of 12.9 seconds. With the extra power, its 50 to  time is just 2.1 seconds. Top speed is over 185 mph (298 km/h).

Marcos Engineering Ltd went into administration on 9 October 2007, production was only 5 or 6 road cars plus some incomplete.

References

TSO
Sports cars